{{DISPLAYTITLE:C9H17NO4}}
The molecular formula C9H17NO4 (molar mass: 203.23 g/mol, exact mass: 203.1158 u) may refer to:

 Acetylcarnitine (ALC)
 Succinylmonocholine